The 1937–38 LFF Lyga was the 17th season of the LFF Lyga football competition in Lithuania.  It was contested by 10 teams, and KSS Klaipėda won the championship.

League standings

Playoff
KSS Klaipėda 3-1 LGSF Kaunas

References
RSSSF

LFF Lyga seasons
Lith
1938 in Lithuanian football
1937 in Lithuanian football